Sphenomorphus cranei, also known commonly as Crane’s skink and Crane's forest skink, is a species of lizard in the family Scincidae. The species is endemic to the Solomon Islands.

Etymology
The specific name, cranei, is in honor of American philanthropist Cornelius Vanderbilt Crane.

Habitat

Reproduction
S. cranei is oviparous.

References

Further reading
Greer AE, Parker F (1974). "The fasciatus species group of Sphenomorphus (Lacertilia: Scincidae): notes on eight previously described species and descriptions of three new species". Papua New Guinea Science Society Proceedings 25: 31–61. (Sphenomorphus cranei, p. 42).
McCoy M (2006). Reptiles of the Solomon Islands. Sofia, Bulgaria: Pensoft Publishers. 212 pp. .
Schmidt KP (1932). "Reptiles and Amphibians from the Solomon Islands". Field Museum of Natural History, Zoological Series 18 (9): 175–190. (Sphenomorphus cranei, new species, pp. 182–183).

cranei
Reptiles described in 1932
Taxa named by Karl Patterson Schmidt
Reptiles of the Solomon Islands